Thomas Walmsley may refer to:
T. Semmes Walmsley (Thomas Semmes Walmsley, 1889–1942), mayor of New Orleans, Louisiana
Thomas Walmsley (judge) (1537–1612), English judge and politician
Thomas Walmsley (died 1637), English politician
Thomas Walmsley and Sons, a company that manufactured wrought iron
Thomas Walmsley (anatomist) (1889–1951), Scottish anatomist